Phostria calydon is a moth in the family Crambidae first described by Herbert Druce in 1885. It is found in Ecuador.

References

Moths described in 1885
Phostria
Moths of South America